Neosilurus brevidorsalis, commonly known as shortfin tandan or shortfin catfish, is a species of catfish native to lakes, swamps and rivers in northern Australia and New Guinea.

References

Freshwater fish of Australia
Freshwater fish of New Guinea
Venomous fish
Fish described in 1867
Taxa named by Albert Günther
brevidorsalis